ANTI – Contemporary Art Festival  presents site-specific contemporary art covering all artistic forms from sculpture and environmental art to dance, live art and performance. The yearly festival is held in Kuopio, Finland. The first ANTI Festival was organised in 2002 by The Arts Council of Northern Savonia. The ANTI – Contemporary Art Festival Association was established in 2005 to coordinate the festival.

With an emphasis on performance, ANTI has established itself as Finland's foremost presenter of live art while also showcasing new developments in sonic and visual arts. Site-specific and time based works take place in public spaces, on streets, in office buildings, parks, shopping-centres and other privately owned sites, depending on the festival's theme and the nature of the works. The festival programme consists of artworks created by invited artists and artists selected by an open proposal process.

ANTI means ”gift” in Finnish. Therefore, the artworks which are presented are free of charge. The ANTI Festival wants to make art more accessible for everybody. People who usually don't gravitate towards art may become participant viewers of artworks by chance. 'Undoubtedly, it was the unsuspecting audiences - those accidental witnesses who were not purposefully looking out for the art - that probably experienced the disruptive potential of the work most powerfully.'

24.9.2013 ANTI – Contemporary Art Festival launched a new international art award ANTI Festival International Prize for Live Art which was awarded for the first time in 2014.

Live Art Prize 
In 2014 the ANTI festival instigated an International Live Art prize of 30,000 euros

The 2014 prize was awarded to Cassils

The 2015 prize was awarded to Willoh S. Weiland

The 2016 prize was awarded to Terike Haapoja with shortlisted artists Action Hero, My Barbarian and Public Movement

The 2017 prize was awarded to Tania El Khoury with shortlisted artists: Sethembile Msezane, Alexandra Pirici, and the Vacuum Cleaner

The 2018 prize was awarded to Sonya Lindfors with shortlisted artists: All The Queens Men (Australia), Nic Green (United Kingdom), Jeanne van Heeswijk (Netherlands) by a jury chaired by Jacques Rancière

The 2019 prize was awarded to Dana Michel (Canada) with short listed artists Cuqui Jerez (Spain),  Keijaun Thomas (USA) and Mammalian Diving Reflex (Canada) 

The 2020 prize was awarded to Brian Fuata (Australia) with short listed artists Geumhyung Jeong (South Korea), W A U H A U S (Finland), Ingri Fiksdal (Norway)

The 2021 prize was awarded to Alex Baczynski-Jenkins (Poland/UK) with short listed artists keyon gaskin (US), Florentina Holzinger (Austria), Narcissister (US) 

The 2022 prize was awarded to Latai Taumoepeau (Australia/Tonga) with short listed artists Liz Rosenfeld (US/ Germany), River Lin (Taiwan), Zinzi Minott (UK)

Themes

2003

In year 2002 works were presented for example in a hair salon, a gas station and in a nursing home. Main artists of the festival were butch artist Saga Kobayashi from Japan and Live Art artists Eve Dent and Kira O'Reilly from England.

2004

International programme included artists from many countries such as Great Britain, Canada, United States of America, Germany, Japan and Netherlands. During four days there were 17 performances. One of them was Will Kwan's (CA) performative lecture in University of Kuopio which was mentioned in media as well as Jennifer Nelson's (US) and Glen Redpath's (CA) work Prisma Relay. Prisma Relay was held in local super market where it brought running competition and consuming hysteria of Friday afternoon together.

2005

Theme of the year was time. The theme was crystallized by Charles Landry who said: ”It is important that a city does not wipe out its memory”.

2006

Some place might make you laugh. Some place will make you think. Somewhere you will not find art at all. You will walk through the city with a headset on. You will breath the same air with the artist. Somewhere you perhaps will feel strange pleasure. You will not even dare to enter somewhere. Somewhere you might get shocked. You may discover a slight disorder.

There were 17 artists from all over the world giving their performances in Kuopio City Hall, Väinölänniemi Tennis Court, Youth Center 44, Hotel Puijonsarvi, Huuhanmäki Observatory, Cinema Maxim, an empty property on Tasavallankatu, balcony of the Carlson department store, Kuopio airport, Savonia University of Applied Sciences, Health Professions Kuopio, an apartment mediated by the real estate agency Huoneistokeskus and the office of Reijo Kela.

2007

For the 2007 edition of the festival a community college, a skateboarding park, the pages of a city newspaper, a late-night grill, a children's playground and an entire island were negotiated by an international program of artists. One of the most attractive works of the year was the vacuum cleaner's One Hundred Thousand Pieces of Possibility where the artist gave away 1000 euros in 1 cent pieces. Claire Blundell Jones's work Introducing Tumbleweed to the Finnish Landscape was also well noticed in media.

2008

For ANTI 2008 Kuopio's residents opened their homes to audiences and host works made for domestic space. Other projects took place in a sports stadium, on a public stage, across the network of city streets and on, and under, the Rönö bridge.

2009

In year 2009 the theme of ANTI was walking. For example, Vincent Chevalier (CA) traveled from one place to another walking along a 2-metre length of red carpet by which he gave himself The Red Carpet Treatment. Tim Knowles (UK) in term set off walking and were guided solely by the wind. For this piece he had created a wind vane mounted to a helmet.

2010

This edition of ANTI concentrated on how artists working with writing and language navigate, read and inhabit the city.

2011

2011 was year of celebration since it was 10th ANTI Festival. There were pieces presented by artists from Great Britain, United States, Canada, Belgium and France. In the programme there was for example Blast Theory's Rider Spoke which was a work for cyclists who explored the city by bike, looked for places to hide recorded messages and found digital treasures others have hidden, the choir conducted by Heidi Fast and a balloon piece by Gaëtan Rusquet. The festival culminated with Mammalian Diving Reflex's The Children's Choice Awards where the only opinions that mattered were those of the kids.

2012

This year the ANTI – Contemporary Art Festival programme worked on the themes of man's relationship with nature and the connection between sexuality and the body as well as the natural state of the human body. The festival took  over public spaces in Kuopio for the 11th time. And not just in the town — the Luonnon ANTI programme set up camp on the island of Karhunsaari as well. A weekend-long artwork and workshop programme were planned especially with children in mind.

2013

As usual, the ANTI Festival offered unexpected encounters in Kuopio and Northern Savonia. In this, its twelfth year, the international festival of contemporary art spread to other locations too, such as Lapinlahti, Hietasalo island and the smoke sauna in Rauhalahti. In Cruising for Art about 20 Finnish and international artists made over 800 1-to-1 performances around Kuopio. Also the first PechaKucha night in Kuopio was organized during the festival.

2014

Children and teenagers were in the focus of this year's ANTI – Contemporary Art Festival. The international festival programme consisted of work where the youngest family members or youngsters nearing adulthood were either the theme or an active part of the production. This year the first ever ANTI Festival International Prize for Live Art was awarded. Winner of the first prize was Canadian artist Heather Cassils.

Recent events
Artistic Directors Mrs. Johanna Tuukkanen and Mr. Erkki Soininen of the ANTI -festival received a Finnish State Prize for the Arts on November 16, 2006.

Erkki Soininen was replaced by a Briton, Mr. Gregg Whelan, who was appointed as Co-Artistic Director of ANTI in February 2007. Whelan has participated in ANTI as an artist since 2003. Whelan also works as a performance-maker, writer and co-artistic director of Lone Twin and Lone Twin Theatre.

ANTI – Contemporary Art Festival has participated in EU projects A Space for Live Art and Up to Nature.

References

External links
ANTI - Contemporary Art Festival -site
"New Co-Artistic Director selected for the ANTI Festival". February 5th, 2007. (pdf)

Festivals in Finland
Kuopio
Festivals established in 2002
Tourist attractions in North Savo
2002 establishments in Finland
Street art festivals